Samuel McKee (November 5, 1833 – December 11, 1898) was a U.S. Representative from Kentucky.

Early life
Born near Mount Sterling, Kentucky, McKee attended the common schools. He was graduated from Miami University, Oxford, Ohio, in 1857, and the Cincinnati Law School in 1858. He was admitted to the bar.

Career
McKee commenced practice in Mount Sterling, Kentucky, in 1858. He served in the Union Army during the Civil War as a captain in the 14th Kentucky Volunteer Cavalry.

McKee was elected as an Unconditional Unionist to the Thirty-ninth Congress (March 4, 1865 – March 3, 1867). He successfully contested as a Republican the election of John D. Young to the Fortieth Congress and served from June 22, 1868, to March 3, 1869.
He was not a candidate for renomination in 1868. He served as delegate to the Southern Loyalist Convention at Philadelphia in 1866. He worked as a pension agent in Louisville, Kentucky from 1869 to 1871. He resumed the practice of law. He died in Louisville, Kentucky on December 11, 1898. He was interred in Cave Hill Cemetery in Louisville.

References

1833 births
1898 deaths
People from Montgomery County, Kentucky
Unconditional Union Party members of the United States House of Representatives from Kentucky
Republican Party members of the United States House of Representatives from Kentucky
Union Army officers
People of Kentucky in the American Civil War
Politicians from Louisville, Kentucky
Miami University alumni
Burials at Cave Hill Cemetery
19th-century American politicians